Pernumia is a comune (municipality) in the Province of Padua in the Italian region Veneto, located about  southwest of Venice and about  southwest of Padua.

Pernumia borders the following municipalities: Battaglia Terme, Cartura, Due Carrare, Monselice, San Pietro Viminario.

Demographic evolution

References

Cities and towns in Veneto